Race for Your Life, Charlie Brown is a 1977 American animated adventure comedy film produced by United Feature Syndicate for Paramount Pictures, directed by Bill Melendez and Phil Roman, and the third in a series of films based on the Peanuts comic strip. It was the first Peanuts feature-length film produced after the death of composer Vince Guaraldi, who was originally intended to score the film, and used the same voice cast from the 1975 and 1976 TV specials, You're a Good Sport, Charlie Brown,  Happy Anniversary, Charlie Brown, and It's Arbor Day, Charlie Brown, and the same voice cast member from the 1974 TV special, It's a Mystery, Charlie Brown. However, Liam Martin voiced Linus van Pelt for the last time in the movie, and went on to voice Charlie Brown in the 1978 TV special, What a Nightmare, Charlie Brown!. This would be Stuart Brotman's final role before his death from a brain aneurysm in 2011.

The film received mixed-to-positive reviews from critics, and came five years after Snoopy, Come Home, and three years before Bon Voyage, Charlie Brown (and Don't Come Back!!).

Plot

The Peanuts gang heads off to Camp Remote somewhere in the mountains. Accidentally left behind by the bus while at a desolate rest stop, Charlie Brown is forced to hitch a harrowing ride on Snoopy's motorcycle in order to make the rest of the journey to the camp, accompanied by rock guitar type riffs while protesting Snoopy's wild driving.

Upon arrival, the kids are immediately exposed to the regimentation and squalor of camp life which completely differs from their comfortable residences back home. They struggle with the concept that the camp schedule is in the 24-hour clock (Franklin asks if "oh-five-hundred" [5:00 AM] is noon, and Sally thinks "eighteen-hundred" [6:00 PM] is a year). Although they attempt to adjust to camp life, Snoopy, in his own tent, enjoys an ice cream sundae while watching a Western film on his portable TV set.

The gang must contend with a trio of ruthless bullies (and their bobcat, Brutus, vicious enough to intimidate even Snoopy and Woodstock) who openly boast of having won a raft race every year they have competed, but are only repelled when Linus uses his security blanket as a whip (which also gets him unwanted attention from Sally, who praises the courage of her self-proclaimed "Sweet Babboo"). It is revealed that they have only "won" through outright cheating — using a raft equipped with an outboard motor, direction finder, radar and sonar, along with utilizing every trick available to thwart everyone else's chance to even make it to the finish line, much less win the race.

The kids are broken into three groups: the boys' group (consisting of Charlie Brown, Linus, Schroeder, and Franklin), the girls' group (consisting of Peppermint Patty, Marcie, Sally, and Lucy), and Snoopy and Woodstock. Charlie Brown reluctantly leads the boys' group, struggling with insecurity but doing anything possible to work things out and implement his decisions. His antithesis is Peppermint Patty, the very confident but inept leader of the girls' group who does little more than stand around and give orders. Moreover, she insists that every decision, regardless of inconsequentiality, be confirmed by a vote of secret ballots. Predictably, when the voting is tied or she disagrees with the outcome, she often overrules the decision, angering the other girls. The overconfident bullies use their cheating to burst ahead, but while boasting, they fail to watch where they are going and crash into a dock, costing them substantial time and effort to dislodge their boat while the others sail past.

The groups see many unique sights along the river race, such as mountains, forests, and a riparian logging community of houses built on docks. However, they also run into different obstacles: getting lost, stranded, storms, blizzards, and sabotage from the bullies. Snoopy abandons the race to search tirelessly for Woodstock when a storm separates them; finding an abandoned cabin to retire for the night, was spooked by a bear that was at the door when he was trying to sleep: as was the bear when seeing Snoopy. After a long search, they manage to find each other and are joyfully reunited, later reuniting at the abandoned cabin where the girls claimed it for the night, kicking the boys (including Snoopy and Woodstock) outside where they then had to camp in the snow. Charlie Brown grows increasingly into his leadership role; ultimately, after the bullies sabotage everyone else's rafts, the boys' and girls' teams merge. Although blamed for problems, Charlie Brown handles them well; for instance, when the team is trapped on a water wheel, he decides, as the leader, to remove the obstacle.

Thanks to Charlie Brown's growing self-confidence and leadership, the gang has a good chance of winning the race at its climax, after overcoming considerable odds. Unfortunately, Peppermint Patty incites the girls to celebrate prematurely; after accidentally knocking the boys overboard, the girls attempt to rescue them, only to fall overboard themselves.

Seizing the opportunity to pull ahead, the bullies gloat about their apparently imminent victory; however, their brash over-confidence, infighting, and constant carelessness during the race has seen them become involved in numerous mishaps, substantially damaging their raft. Just shy of the finish line, their raft finally gives out and sinks, leaving Snoopy and Woodstock as the only contenders left. Brutus slashes Snoopy's inner tube with a claw, but Woodstock promptly builds a raft of twigs (with a leaf for a sail) and continues toward victory. When Brutus is about to attack Woodstock, Snoopy punches him, and Woodstock wins the race. Conceding defeat, the bullies vow vengeance next year, but their threats are humiliatingly stopped when Snoopy clobbers and punches Brutus for threatening Woodstock again, sending a terrified Brutus scampering away.

As the gang boards the bus to depart for home, Charlie Brown decides aloud to use the experience as a lesson to be more confident and assertive, and to believe in himself. Unfortunately, right after he finishes speaking, the bus leaves without him once again, forcing him to hitch another ride with Snoopy and Woodstock on his motorcycle.

Voice cast
 Duncan Watson as Charlie Brown
 Bill Melendez as Snoopy, Woodstock
 Gail Davis as Sally Brown
 Melanie Kohn as Lucy Van Pelt
 Liam Martin as Linus Van Pelt
 Stuart Brotman as Peppermint Patty
 Jimmy Ahrens as Marcie
 Greg Felton as Schroeder, Camp Announcer
 Tom Muller as Franklin, Bully #1
 Kirk Jue as Bully #2
 Jordan Warren as Bully #3
 Fred Van Amburg as Radio Announcer
 Jackson Beck as Brutus
Violet, Patty, Pig-Pen, 5, Frieda, and Roy have silent roles.

Reception
Race for Your Life, Charlie Brown received 3 out of 5 stars in The New York Times from Janet Maslin, who wrote: "The film runs an hour and quarter and has a rambling plot about a regatta, but it seems less like a continuous story than a series of droll blackout sketches, many of them ending with the obligatory 'Good Grief!' ... The net effect is that of having read the comic strip for an unusually long spell, which can amount to either a delightful experience or a pleasant but slightly wearing one, depending upon the intensity of one's fascination with the basic 'Peanuts' mystique."

Leonard Maltin gave the movie 2.5 out of 4 stars (his lowest rating for the original four Peanuts movies), stating it's "mildly entertaining, but lacks punch".

Home media
The film was released on VHS in 1979 as a Fotomat exclusive, Betamax the same year and LaserDisc in the early 1980s and was also the very first release in 1981 on RCA's now defunct CED format. The VHS was released to mass markets in the early 1980's. It was released on VHS again with new artwork on August 17, 1994, and again on October 1, 1996, under the Paramount Family Favorites label. The film was released for the first time on DVD on February 10, 2015.

See also
 Peanuts filmography

References

External links

 
 

1977 films
1977 animated films
1970s American animated films
1970s buddy comedy films
American children's animated adventure films
Animated buddy films
American buddy comedy films
American children's animated comedy films
Animated films about children
1970s English-language films
Films directed by Bill Melendez
Films directed by Phil Roman
Films scored by Ed Bogas
Films with screenplays by Charles M. Schulz
Paramount Pictures animated films
Paramount Pictures films
Peanuts films
Rafting films
Films about summer camps
Films about competitions
1977 comedy films
1970s children's animated films